Ātiu Creek Regional Park is a regional park located south of Oruawharo River in the Kaipara Harbour in New Zealand's North Island. It is located west of Wellsford and east of Tapora on the Okahukura Peninsula, in Rodney in the Auckland Region and is run by Auckland Council.

History

The park, alongside the other areas of the Okahukura Peninsula, have had a long history of occupation by Tāmaki Māori. In addition to the numerous archaeological sites found in the park, the eastern edge of the park was the location of the Opou portage, an important link between the Oruawharo and the Tauhoa rivers, two estuarial arms of the Kaipara Harbour. At the Opou portage, waka could be hauled a short distance between the two water bodies. The mana whenua of the area are Te Uri-o-Hau, a tribe of the Ngāti Whātua people. Members of Te Uri-o-Hau have erected a number of carved pou at the regional park.

During the colonial era of New Zealand, the park was forested. Most of the trees were milled for timber, and after World War I, the land was subdivided into farm blocks.

The park was gifted to the Auckland Regional Council by Pierre and Jackie Chatelanat in 2006, whose family had first acquired the land in 1951. It was officially opened as a regional park two years later in April 2008. Since opening, the regional park has continued to be run as a working sheep and cattle farm.

References 

Rodney Local Board Area
Parks in the Auckland Region
Regional parks of New Zealand
Tourist attractions in the Auckland Region